Victor Ivan Badeley (22 November 1898 – 19 February 1971) was an All Blacks rugby union player from New Zealand.  He was a three-quarter.
He toured Australia in 1922, when no tests were played.

He suffered a head injury during the 1924 All Black trials, which ended his rugby career.

He was born and died in Auckland, and went to Auckland Grammar School.

His brother Cecil Badeley was an All Black in 1920, 1921 and 1924.

References

Bibliography
Palenski, R., Chester, R., and McMillan, N., (2005). The Encyclopaedia of New Zealand Rugby (4th ed.).  Auckland: Hodder Moa Beckett. 

1898 births
1987 deaths
New Zealand rugby union players
New Zealand international rugby union players
Rugby union wings
Rugby union players from Auckland
People educated at Auckland Grammar School
Rugby union fullbacks
Rugby union centres